Qarah Guzlu-ye Olya (also Romanized as Qarah Gūzlū-ye ‘Olyā; also known as Qarah Gowzlū) is a village in Qazvineh Rural District, in the Central District of Kangavar County, Kermanshah Province, Iran. At the 2006 census, its population was 247, in 65 families.

References 

Populated places in Kangavar County